Bloodletting (or blood-letting) is the withdrawal of blood from a patient to prevent or cure illness and disease.  Bloodletting, whether by a physician or by leeches, was based on an ancient system of medicine in which blood and other bodily fluids were regarded as "humours" that had to remain in proper balance to maintain health. It is claimed to have been the most common medical practice performed by surgeons from antiquity until the late 19th century, a span of over 2,000 years. In Europe, the practice continued to be relatively common until the end of the 19th century. The practice has now been abandoned by modern-style medicine for all except a few very specific medical conditions. In the overwhelming majority of cases, the historical use of bloodletting was harmful to patients.

Today, the term phlebotomy refers to the drawing of blood for laboratory analysis or blood transfusion. Therapeutic phlebotomy refers to the drawing of a unit of blood in specific cases like hemochromatosis, polycythemia vera, porphyria cutanea tarda, etc., to reduce the number of red blood cells. The traditional medical practice of bloodletting is today considered to be a pseudoscience.

In the ancient world

Passages from the Ebers Papyrus may indicate that bloodletting by scarification  was an accepted practice in Ancient Egypt.
Egyptian burials have been reported to contain bloodletting instruments.
According to some accounts, the Egyptians based the idea on their observations of the hippopotamus, confusing its red secretions with blood and believing that it scratched itself to relieve distress.

In Greece, bloodletting was in use in the 5th century BC during the lifetime of Hippocrates, who mentions this practice but generally relied on dietary techniques. Erasistratus, however, theorized that many diseases were caused by plethoras, or overabundances, in the blood and advised that these plethoras be treated, initially, by exercise, sweating, reduced food intake, and vomiting. His student Herophilus also opposed bloodletting. But a contemporary Greek physician, Archagathus, one of the first to practice in Rome, did believe in the value of bloodletting.

"Bleeding" a patient to health was modeled on the process of menstruation. Hippocrates believed that menstruation functioned to "purge women of bad humours". During the Roman Empire, the Greek physician Galen, who subscribed to the teachings of Hippocrates, advocated physician-initiated bloodletting.

The popularity of bloodletting in the classical Mediterranean world was reinforced by the ideas of Galen, after he discovered that not only veins but also arteries were filled with blood, not air as was commonly believed at the time. There were two key concepts in his system of bloodletting. The first was that blood was created and then used up; it did not circulate, and so it could "stagnate" in the extremities. The second was that humoral balance was the basis of illness or health, the four humours being blood, phlegm, black bile, and yellow bile, relating to the four Greek classical elements of air, water, earth, and fire respectively. Galen believed that blood was the dominant humour and the one in most need of control. In order to balance the humours, a physician would either remove "excess" blood (plethora) from the patient or give them an emetic to induce vomiting, or a diuretic to induce urination.

Galen created a complex system of how much blood should be removed based on the patient's age, constitution, the season, the weather and the place. "Do-it-yourself" bleeding instructions following these systems were developed. Symptoms of plethora were believed to include fever, apoplexy, and headache. The blood to be let was of a specific nature determined by the disease: either arterial or venous, and distant or close to the area of the body affected. He linked different blood vessels with different organs, according to their supposed drainage. For example, the vein in the right hand would be let for liver problems and the vein in the left hand for problems with the spleen. The more severe the disease, the more blood would be let. Fevers required copious amounts of bloodletting.

Middle Ages 
The Talmud recommended a specific day of the week and days of the month for bloodletting in the Shabbat tractate, and similar rules, though less codified, can be found among Christian writings advising which saints' days were favourable for bloodletting. During medieval times bleeding charts were common, showing specific bleeding sites on the body in alignment with the planets and zodiacs. Islamic medical authors also advised bloodletting, particularly for fevers. It was practised according to seasons and certain phases of the Moon in the lunar calendar. The practice was probably passed by the Greeks with the translation of ancient texts to Arabic and is different than bloodletting by cupping mentioned in the traditions of Muhammad. When Muslim theories became known in the Latin-speaking countries of Europe, bloodletting became more widespread. Together with cautery, it was central to Arabic surgery; the key texts Kitab al-Qanun and especially  both recommended it. It was also known in Ayurvedic medicine, described in the Susruta Samhita.

Use through the 19th century

Even after the humoral system fell into disuse, the practice was continued by surgeons and barber-surgeons. Though the bloodletting was often recommended by physicians, it was carried out by barbers. This led to the distinction between physicians and surgeons. The red-and-white-striped pole of the barbershop, still in use today, is derived from this practice: the red symbolizes blood while the white symbolizes the bandages. Bloodletting was used to "treat" a wide range of diseases, becoming a standard treatment for almost every ailment, and was practiced prophylactically as well as therapeutically.

A number of different methods were employed. The most common was phlebotomy, or venesection (often called "breathing a vein"), in which blood was drawn from one or more of the larger external veins, such as those in the forearm or neck. In arteriotomy, an artery was punctured, although generally only in the temples. In scarification (not to be confused with scarification, a method of body modification), the "superficial" vessels were attacked, often using a syringe, a spring-loaded lancet, or a glass cup that contained heated air, producing a vacuum within (see fire cupping). There was also a specific bloodletting tool called a scarificator, used primarily in 19th century medicine. It has a spring-loaded mechanism with gears that snaps the blades out through slits in the front cover and back in, in a circular motion. The case is cast brass, and the mechanism and blades steel. One knife bar gear has slipped teeth, turning the blades in a different direction than those on the other bars. The last photo and the diagram show the depth adjustment bar at the back and sides.

Leeches could also be used. The withdrawal of so much blood as to induce syncope (fainting) was considered beneficial, and many sessions would only end when the patient began to swoon.

William Harvey disproved the basis of the practice in 1628,  and the introduction of scientific medicine, la méthode numérique, allowed Pierre Charles Alexandre Louis to demonstrate that phlebotomy was entirely ineffective in the treatment of pneumonia and various fevers in the 1830s. Nevertheless, in 1838, a lecturer at the Royal College of Physicians would still state that "blood-letting is a remedy which, when judiciously employed, it is hardly possible to estimate too highly", and Louis was dogged by the sanguinary Broussais, who could recommend leeches fifty at a time. Some physicians resisted Louis' work because they "were not prepared to discard therapies 'validated by both tradition and their own experience on account of somebody else's numbers'."

During this era, bloodletting was used to treat almost every disease. One British medical text recommended bloodletting for acne, asthma, cancer, cholera, coma, convulsions, diabetes, epilepsy, gangrene, gout, herpes, indigestion, insanity, jaundice, leprosy, ophthalmia, plague, pneumonia, scurvy, smallpox, stroke, tetanus, tuberculosis, and for some one hundred other diseases. Bloodletting was even used to treat most forms of hemorrhaging such as nosebleed, excessive menstruation, or hemorrhoidal bleeding. Before surgery or at the onset of childbirth, blood was removed to prevent inflammation. Before amputation, it was customary to remove a quantity of blood equal to the amount believed to circulate in the limb that was to be removed.

There were also theories that bloodletting would cure "heartsickness" and "heartbreak". A French physician, Jacques Ferrand wrote a book in 1623 on the uses of bloodletting to cure a broken heart. He recommended bloodletting to the point of heart failure (literal).

Leeches became especially popular in the early 19th century. In the 1830s, the French imported about 40 million leeches a year for medical purposes, and in the next decade, England imported 6 million leeches a year from France alone. Through the early decades of the century, hundreds of millions of leeches were used by physicians throughout Europe.

One typical course of medical treatment began the morning of 13 July 1824. A French sergeant was stabbed through the chest while engaged in single combat; within minutes, he fainted from loss of blood. Arriving at the local hospital he was immediately bled twenty ounces (570 ml) "to prevent inflammation". During the night he was bled another 24 ounces (680 ml). Early the next morning, the chief surgeon bled the patient another 10 ounces (285 ml); during the next 14 hours, he was bled five more times. Medical attendants thus intentionally removed more than half of the patient's normal blood supply—in addition to the initial blood loss which caused the sergeant to faint. Bleedings continued over the next several days. By 29 July, the wound had become inflamed. The physician applied 32 leeches to the most sensitive part of the wound. Over the next three days, there were more bleedings and a total of 40 more leeches. The sergeant recovered and was discharged on 3 October. His physician wrote that "by the large quantity of blood lost, amounting to 170 ounces [nearly eleven pints] (4.8 liters), besides that drawn by the application of leeches [perhaps another two pints] (1.1 liters), the life of the patient was preserved". By nineteenth-century standards, thirteen pints of blood taken over the space of a month was a large but not an exceptional quantity. The medical literature of the period contains many similar accounts-some successful, some not.

Bloodletting was also popular in the young United States of America, where Benjamin Rush (a signatory of the Declaration of Independence) saw the state of the arteries as the key to disease, recommending levels of bloodletting that were high even for the time. George Washington asked to be bled heavily after he developed a throat infection from weather exposure. Within a ten-hour period, a total of 124–126 ounces (3.75 liters) of blood was withdrawn prior to his death from a throat infection in 1799.

One reason for the continued popularity of bloodletting (and purging) was that, while anatomical knowledge, surgical and diagnostic skills increased tremendously in Europe from the 17th century, the key to curing disease remained elusive, and the underlying belief was that it was better to give any treatment than nothing at all. The psychological benefit of bloodletting to the patient (a placebo effect) may sometimes have outweighed the physiological problems it caused. Bloodletting slowly lost favour during the 19th century, after French physician Dr. Pierre Louis conducted an experiment in which he studied the effect of bloodletting on pneumonia patients. A number of other ineffective or harmful treatments were available as placebos—mesmerism, various processes involving the new technology of electricity, many potions, tonics, and elixirs. Yet, bloodletting persisted during the 19th century partly because it was readily available to people of any socioeconomic status.

Controversy and use into the 20th century
Bloodletting gradually declined in popularity over the course of the 19th century, becoming rather uncommon in most places, before its validity was thoroughly debated. In the medical community of Edinburgh, bloodletting was abandoned in practice before it was challenged in theory, a contradiction highlighted by physician-physiologist John Hughes Bennett. Authorities such as Austin Flint I, Hiram Corson, and William Osler became prominent supporters of bloodletting in the 1880s and onwards, disputing Bennett's premise that bloodletting had fallen into disuse because it did not work. These advocates framed bloodletting as an orthodox medical practice, to be used in spite of its general unpopularity. Some physicians considered bloodletting useful for a more limited range of purposes, such as to "clear out" infected or weakened blood or its ability to "cause hæmorrhages to cease"—as evidenced in a call for a "fair trial for blood-letting as a remedy" in 1871.

Some researchers used statistical methods for evaluating treatment effectiveness to discourage bloodletting. But at the same time, publications by Philip Pye-Smith and others defended bloodletting on scientific grounds.

Bloodletting persisted into the 20th century and was recommended in the 1923 edition of the textbook The Principles and Practice of Medicine. The textbook was originally written by Sir William Osler and continued to be published in new editions under new authors following Osler's death in 1919.

Phlebotomy
Bloodletting is used today in the treatment of a few diseases, including hemochromatosis and polycythemia; however, these rare diseases were unknown and undiagnosable before the advent of scientific medicine.  It is practiced by specifically trained practitioners in hospitals, using modern techniques, and is also known as a therapeutic phlebotomy.
In most cases, phlebotomy now refers to the removal of small quantities of blood for diagnostic purposes. However, in the case of hemochromatosis, bloodletting (by venipuncture) has become the mainstay treatment option. In the U.S., according to an academic article posted in the Journal of Infusion Nursing with data published in 2010, the primary use of phlebotomy was to take blood that would one day be reinfused back into a person.

In alternative medicine
Though bloodletting as a general health measure has been shown to be pseudoscience, it is still commonly indicated for a wide variety of conditions in the Ayurvedic, Unani, and traditional Chinese systems of alternative medicine. Unani is based on a form of humorism, and so in that system, bloodletting is used to correct supposed humoral imbalance.

See also

 Bloodstopping
 Blood donation
 Cupping therapy
 Hematology
 History of medicine
 Trepanation
 Humorism
 Fleams
 Panacea

References

Books cited
 
  Carter, K. Codell (2012). The Decline of Therapeutic Bloodletting and the Collapse of Traditional Medicine. New Brunswick & London: Transaction Publishers. .

Further reading
 McGrew, Roderick. Encyclopedia of Medical History (1985), brief history pp. 32–34

External links

 The History and Progression of Bloodletting
 Medical Antiques: Scarification and Bleeding
 Pictures of antique bloodletting instruments
 PBS's Red Gold: The Story of Blood
 Huge collection of antique bloodletting instruments
 "Breathing a Vein" phisick.com 14 Nov 2011

Blood
Bleeding
Medical tests
Medical treatments
Obsolete medical procedures
Traditional medicine
Pseudoscience